Christian Esquivel Valdes (born September 3, 1985) is a Mexican professional boxer.

He lost to Shinsuke Yamanaka for the WBC bantamweight world title.

Esquivel has a losses against Manny Robles III and Rey Vargas.

References

External links

Living people
1985 births
Mexican male boxers
Super-flyweight boxers
Bantamweight boxers
Super-bantamweight boxers
Boxers from the State of Mexico